Hey Mister, Let's Play! (Czech: Pojďte pane, budeme si hrát) is an animated Czech TV series, created by Břetislav Pojar, Miroslav Štěpánek and Ivan Urban. It used mostly stop motion animation to tell the story of two teddy bears. It is based on a short film How They Met At Kolin (Potkali se u Kolína, 1965). It was filmed between 1965 and 1973. The second season on the other hand is named Kdo to hodil, panove  (Who threw that, Gentleman).

References

External links

1960s Czechoslovak television series
1970s Czechoslovak television series
1965 Czechoslovak television series debuts
1973 Czechoslovak television series endings
Czechoslovak television series
Czech animated television series
Czech children's television series
Stop-motion animated television series
Fictional teddy bears
Animated television series about bears
Animated television series about children